The Singapore Chess Championship is the annual individual national chess championship of Singapore organised by the Singapore Chess Federation. The event also features a Challengers section, which is a FIDE-rated tournament for amateur chess players. In 2015, the Challengers section was named "Singapore Amateur Chess Championship".

Winners

References

 Unofficial list of champions 1949-2005. Ajedrez de ataque (in Spanish).
 Detailed results from the Singapore Chess Federation: 2011,
2008, 2007 Men, 2007 Women, 2006 Men, 2006 Women, 2005 Men, 2005 Women, 2004 Men, 2004 Women, 2003 Men, 2003 Women, 2002, 2001

 Results at chess-results.com: 2009, 2011, 2012, 2013, 2014, 2015, 2016, 2017, 2018

 Results James Long's Chess in Singapore: 1997-1998

Chess national championships
Women's chess national championships
Championship
1949 in chess